Ragnagard is 2D arcade fighting game developed by Saurus and System Vision, and published by SNK and Saurus for the Neo Geo arcade, Neo Geo CD and Sega Saturn. The game's characters are all based on Shinto deities.

Gameplay

Ragnagard is a fighting game using pre-rendered sprites similar to that of Rare's Killer Instinct but with different gameplay mechanics. The game features an Aerial Battle System which is done by pushing up on the joystick and both of the weak punch and weak kick buttons together, allowing for air combos and air dashing. Players can also charge up the power gauge (based on four elements of Water, Wind, Fire, and Thunder, though each character only uses two of the four elements) which allows for Desperation Moves to be performed. Super Desperation Moves can be performed only if the player's life is flashing red, similar to The King of Fighters series.

Ports and related releases
Ragnagard was later ported to the Neo-Geo AES, the home console version of the Neo-Geo MVS. This version features limited continues and different difficulty settings. This version was re-released through the Wii's Virtual Console exclusively in Japan. Ragnagard was also ported to the Neo-Geo CD exclusively in Japan; this version features an improved intro, slightly cleaner background music, and a few other tweaks. This version of Ragnagard was later ported to the Sega Saturn, also exclusively in Japan. This version features a few new modes and control customization, while some of the game's graphics and gameplay were improved and altered. Unlike the arcade and Neo-Geo versions, in which the player can play as one of the bosses by entering a cheat code, the Neo-Geo CD and Sega Saturn versions allow the player to play as the bosses only by entering the versus mode.

Reception 

Ragnagard received generally mixed reception from critics since its release.

Of Electronic Gaming Monthlys four reviewers, Crispin Boyer had a subdued reaction, but the other three panned the game. Shawn Smith and Sushi-X found it boring due to the characters' choppy movements and the lag time between each move, and Dan Hsu and Sushi-X remarked that while the pre-fight animations are impressive, the graphics are undistinguished once the fight starts. MAN!ACs Robert Bannert commended the character designs but felt overall mixed about Ragnagard when reviewing the Saturn conversion in regards to several design aspects. Player Ones Christophe Delpierre compared the visual style of the game with Killer Instinct.

In a retrospective review for AllGame, Kyle Knight felt mixed in regard to the pre-rendered visual presentation and audio design but criticized the balance issues with characters and gameplay.

Notes

References

External links 
 Ragnagard at GameFAQs
 Ragnagard at Giant Bomb
 Ragnagard at Killer List of Videogames
 Ragnagard at MobyGames

1996 video games
ACA Neo Geo games
Arcade video games
D4 Enterprise games
Fighting games
Multiplayer and single-player video games
Neo Geo games
Neo Geo CD games
Nintendo Switch games
PlayStation Network games
PlayStation 4 games
Saurus games
Sega Saturn games
SNK games
Video games based on Japanese mythology
Video games set in Japan
Video games with pre-rendered 3D graphics
Virtual Console games
Video games developed in Japan
Xbox One games
Hamster Corporation games